Allen 'Shorty' Daniels (born 21 April 1959) is a former Australian rules footballer who played for Footscray in the Victorian Football League (VFL). He also played with Claremont and Perth in the West Australian Football League (WAFL).

Daniels, a five time Western Australian interstate representative, was a Claremont premiership player in 1981 when he came off the interchange bench in the Grand Final win over South Fremantle. He represented Australia in the 1984 International Rules series.

After transferring to Footscray, Daniels appeared in all but one of their 25 games in the 1985 VFL season, including three finals. He kicked two goals in the Semi Final victory over North Melbourne and also played in the Preliminary Final loss to Hawthorn.

A wingman, he struggled in 1986 with a groin injury and returned to Claremont the following year. He didn't see out the 1987 season at Claremont and instead crossed to Perth where he finished his career.

References

Holmesby, Russell and Main, Jim (2007). The Encyclopedia of AFL Footballers. 7th ed. Melbourne: Bas Publishing.

1959 births
Living people
Western Bulldogs players
Claremont Football Club players
Perth Football Club players
Australian rules footballers from Western Australia
Western Australian State of Origin players
Australia international rules football team players